Wits University Football Club, also known as Wits FC, is the football club representing the University of the Witwatersrand based in Johannesburg, South Africa.

Wits University Football Club boasts the largest number of members for any single sporting code in the university with two men's teams, a ladies teams and a junior program for prospective students.

The Men's & Ladies' First Teams represent the university in the University Sports South Africa (USSA) Football Gauteng league, and are regular participants in the USSA Football National Club Championships competing with the top 16 university teams in the country, held in December of each year. The men's senior team, coached by Mark Haskins, is ranked 8th in the country following participation in the National Championships. The women's team, coached by Jabulile Baloyi, narrowly missed out on qualification. The women's team also occasionally participates in external tournaments, such as the annual Zodwa Khoza Cup.

The USSA Football National Club Championships act as the qualifiers to the prestigious Varsity Sports Football tournament of the following year; with the top eight men's teams and top four ladies' teams affiliated with Varsity Sports booking their place in the tournament.

The Men's First & Reserve Teams are members of SAFA Soweto, with the First Team playing in the Promotional League, playing towards promotion to the SAB Regional League.

Stadium
Wits FC's home ground is the Bidvest Stadium, located on the university's East Campus in Braamfontein, Johannesburg. The stadium can hold up to 5000 spectators at capacity. The stadium was primarily used by Premier Soccer League outfit, Bidvest Wits F.C., as 50% of the stadium is owned by the university, while Bidvest own the other 50%..

Honours & tournament history

Varsity Football record
2017 Varsity Football - 7th
2016 Varsity Football – 7th
2015 Varsity Football - Semi-final
2014 Varsity Football – did not qualify
2013 Varsity Football – 7th

USSA Football National Club Championships record
Men
2017 – 8th
2016 – 6th
2015 – 7th
2014 – 5th
2013 – Did not qualify
2012 – 5th
2011 – Did Not Qualify
2010 – Did Not Qualify
2009 – Did Not Qualify

Sponsors
Main sponsor: Futurelife
Kit manufacturer: Kappa

First team squad
As of 24 October 2017.

Club officials

Coaching Staff & Technical Team
Men's First Team
Head coach:  Mark Haskins
Assistant coach:  Alzavian van Rheede
Fitness coach:  Restoration Sikhwari
Sports officer:  Monthso Matlala
Team manager:  Sanele Nene

References

External links
 

Football Club
University and college soccer clubs in South Africa
Soccer clubs in Johannesburg